Hyameia, also known as Hyamia (Ὑαμία), was a town of ancient Messenia. According to tradition, Cresphontes established the territory of Hyameia (called the Hyameitis) as one of the five territories into which he divided Messenia. It was located between Messene and Androusa.

References

Populated places in ancient Messenia
Former populated places in Greece
Lost ancient cities and towns